Corn rose may refer to:

Plants
Agrostemma, also known as corn cockle
Papaver rhoeas, also known as corn poppy

Other
Corn Rose, a cargo ship;  see Cornships Management and Agency

See also
Cornrows
Rose (disambiguation)